The Berlin Conference of 1954 was a meeting of the "Big Four" foreign ministers of the United States (John Foster Dulles), Britain (Anthony Eden), France (Georges Bidault), and the Soviet Union (Vyacheslav Molotov) from 25 January to 18 February 1954.

The ministers agreed to call a wider international conference to discuss a settlement to the recent Korean War and the ongoing First Indochina War between France and the Viet Minh, but it failed to reach agreement on issues of European security and the international status of Germany and Austria, then under four-power occupation after World War II.

The meeting was an early fruit of the first period of US-Soviet détente or "thaw" during the Cold War. Little progress was made except with Austria from which the Soviets agreed to withdraw if it were made a neutral country. Later that year, Geneva Conference produced a temporary peace in Indochina and France's withdrawal from Vietnam, but formal peace in Korea remained elusive.

Some effects of the Berlin Conference were that the leaders were unable to reach an agreement. There was a "fear of freedom" between the East and the West on matters such as free elections in Germany and Austria. The Soviet Union  was not willing to place any trust in either country. Eight weeks from the end of the conference, they planned the Geneva Conference.

References

1954 in American politics
1954 in France
1954 in the United Kingdom
1954 in the Soviet Union
January 1954 events in Europe
February 1954 events in Europe
Soviet Union–United Kingdom relations
France–Soviet Union relations
Soviet Union–United States diplomatic conferences
Diplomatic conferences in Germany
1954 in international relations
1950s in Berlin
1954 conferences
Anthony Eden